John Henry Ilsley (June 22, 1806 – May 9, 1880) was a justice of the Louisiana Supreme Court from April 3, 1865, to November 1, 1868.

Born in London Ilsley graduated from the University of Oxford, and emigrated to the United States at the age of 19. He taught school until admitted to the bar. Several of his sons served in the Confederate States Army.

He died in Donaldsonville, Louisiana.

References

1806 births
1880 deaths
Lawyers from London
Alumni of the University of Oxford
Justices of the Louisiana Supreme Court
19th-century American judges
19th-century English lawyers